The 1962–63 season was the 59th season of competitive football in Turkey.

Overview
Galatasaray won their second title, becoming the first club to win back-to-back league titles. Beşiktaş finished runners-up, with Fenerbahçe rounding out the top three. The Turkish Cup was held for the first time at the start of the 1962–63 season. Galatasaray defeated Fenerbahçe 4–2 on aggregate.

In previous years, the league was held with two separate groups. Winners of each group would face each other in a two-legged final. However, the format was changed to a final league table, with the club with the most points crowned champions. The top six clubs from each group qualified for the final group, while the bottom two clubs in each group were relegated (Karagümrük, Şeker Hilal, Vefa, Yeşildirek).

Galatasaray competed in the 1962–63 European Cup, defeating Polish club Polonia Bytom in the first round. They went on to lose 1 – 8 on aggregate against A.C. Milan in the second round. Altay lost to A.S. Roma in the first round of the 1962–63 Inter-Cities Fairs Cup. Fenerbahçe qualified for the Balkans Cup, but the competition was cancelled.

Metin Oktay finished top scorer with 38 goals: 16 during the group stage, and 22 during the finals.

Awards
Top scorer
Metin Oktay (Galatasaray S.K.) - 38 goals

Honours

European qualification

Final league table

Notes
Tiebreakers are the average of goals scored to goals allowed.

Türkiye Kupası final
First leg

Second leg

National team
The Turkey national football team competed in six matches during the 1962–63 season. Their record was two wins, two draws, and two losses. Metin Oktay scored three goals during the season.

References